Live in Los Angeles is the live concert album from musician Zameer.

Track listing

2010 live albums
Zameer Rizvi albums